Khin Tan (also spelled Hkindan) was one of the chief queens of King Kyansittha of Pagan Dynasty of Burma (Myanmar).

References

Bibliography
 

Queens consort of Pagan
11th-century Burmese women